Oranienbaum-Wörlitz is a town in the district of Wittenberg, in Saxony-Anhalt, Germany. It was formed on 1 January 2011 by the merger of the former towns Oranienbaum and Wörlitz and the former municipalities Brandhorst, Gohrau, Griesen, Horstdorf, Kakau, Rehsen, Riesigk and Vockerode. These former municipalities are now Ortschaften (municipal divisions) of the town Oranienbaum-Wörlitz.

References 

 
Wittenberg (district)
Duchy of Anhalt